MLA Fatakeshto is a 2006 Indian Bengali-language political drama film directed by Swapan Saha for Shree Venkatesh Films, starring Mithun Chakraborty, Debashree Roy, Koel Mallick, Rajatava Dutta and Soumitra Chatterjee. It is a remake of the Tamil movie Mudhalvan. It was a commercial success at the box office, helped by the 2006 West Bengal Legislative Assembly election.

It is the first of the two-film Fatakeshto series (the other being Minister Fatakeshto) and has gained fame for its dialogue "" [I will hit you here and the body will be there at the cremation ground]. The film collected  at the Box Office.

Plot 
It is the tale of seven days of a small time goon who becomes an M.L.A.

Cast 
 Mithun Chakraborty as Krishno "Fatakeshto" Deb Chatterjee, who becomes the Home Minister with the help of the CM
 Soumitra Chatterjee as the Chief Minister
 Debashree Roy as Nandini Chatterjee, Krishno's wife
 Rajatava Dutta as the Home Minister Ranadeb Pal
 Koel Mallick as Chaitali Roy, news reporter of Khabor Kolkata
 Shantilal Mukhopadhyay as Haridas Pal, Ranadeb's PA
 Bharat Kaul as DSP Durjoy Naag
 Sanjib Dasgupta as Atim Ghosh, leader of the Opposition
 Sumit Ganguly as Ratan Basak, Ranadeb's henchman
 Shyamal Dutta as chief editor of Khabor Kolkata

Soundtrack

Reception

Box Office 
Made at the budget of  2 crore, the film was released with 61 prints and collected over  7.50 crore in 75 days.

Awards

References

External links 
 

Bengali-language Indian films
Indian political drama films
Political action films
Indian action drama films
Films directed by Swapan Saha
2000s Bengali-language films
Bengali remakes of Tamil films